Langwiesen railway station is a railway station in Langwiesen, part of the municipality of Feuerthalen, in the Swiss canton of Zürich. It is an intermediate stop on the Lake line and is served by local trains only.

Services
Langwiesen is served by the S1 of the St. Gallen S-Bahn:

 : half-hourly service between Schaffhausen and Wil via St. Gallen.

References

External links

Railway stations in the canton of Zürich
Swiss Federal Railways stations